John Fischer (11 August 1930 – 17 August 2016) was an American pianist, composer, and artist. He was a pioneer in the field of computer art. In the 1970s, during the loft jazz era in New York City, Fischer ran a performance loft and gallery known as Environ. He was leader of the group Interface, and he performed with Perry Robinson, Mark Whitecage, Arthur Blythe, Rick Kilburn, and Lester Bowie.

Discography
 6x1=10 Duos for a New Decade (ReEntry, 1980)
 Jam Session Moscow with Hans Kumpf, Leonid Tchizhik, Alexey Zubov (Fusion, 1981)
 Live in Eastern Europe with Perry Robinson (ReEntry, 1982)
 Deep Blue Lake with Theo Jörgensmann (ReEntry, 1984)
 Piano Solo (ReEntry, 1984)

With INTERface
 INTERface NY (Composers Collective, 1976)
 Live at Environ (ReEntry, 1977)
 This Time (ReEntry, 1978)
 Glimpses (ReEntry, 1979)
 Environ Days (Konnex, 1991)
 The New INTERface TRIO (ReEntry, 1995)
 Live at the BIM (ReEntry, 1997)

With others
 Composers Collective, Poum! (Composers Collective, 1974)
 Theo Jörgensmann, Swiss Radio Days Vol. Three (ReEntry, 1994)

Exhibitions 
 Allan Stone Gallery, New York, (1970)
 Palais des Nations, Geneva, (1981)
 Jazz meets Art, Zürich, (1985)
 Galerie Comtemporaine Geneve, (1981)
 Galerie Adriana Stuttgart, (1989)
 Duo Gallery , New York, 1960
 Phoenix Gallery New York, (1963)
 Glay's Gallery New York, (1967)
 MOMA Jewelry by Contemporary Painters and Sculptors, (1967)
 Chelsea Art Museum, New York, (2011)
 NYC Department Cultural Affairs Oversized Drawings and Multiples (1972–73)
 Arbitrage Gallery New York A show of Paper Works ( 1993)
 Galerie OM Art & Musique Interface, France, (1989)
 Lerner Heller Gallery, New York, Drawings, ( 1972
 Gallery Alexandra Monet, Brussels Drawings and Paintings, (1974)

References

External links
 Official site
 "Pianist John Fischer verstarb 86-jährig in New York" Obituary in German

1930 births
2016 deaths
Musicians from Antwerp
20th-century American painters
20th-century American sculptors
20th-century American male artists
21st-century American painters
21st-century American male artists
American digital artists
American jazz pianists
American male painters
American male pianists
American male sculptors
Belgian emigrants to the United States
Belgian Jews
Jewish American artists
Jewish American musicians
American male jazz musicians
American contemporary painters
21st-century American Jews